The Flying Broom is a feminist organization in Turkey. Founded 1996 in Ankara, the organization aims to raise consciousness for gender equality while providing information and training to empower women.

Most recognized for its annual International Women's Film Festival, the Flying Broom has launched several projects in different areas within Turkish civil society. It was particularly influential in the 2005 amendment of the Turkish penal code, turning violent crimes against women into crimes against the victim itself rather than against crimes against property of the family or society.

Since 1998 it has published the bimonthly magazine  ("Flying News").

The organization's projects include:
 Database of Women's organizations in Turkey
 Network of Local Women Reporters
 Women's Website Project
 Gender awareness program "Building bridges"
 From paths to roads
 International Women's Film Festival
 Academic conferences at Ankara's Middle East Technical University
 Radio and television programs

The organization also prepared reports on the situation of women in Turkey for the U.N. Fourth World Conference on Women, 1995 in Beijing.

Currently, the organization is lead coordinator of the EU funded Civil Society Dialogue project "Watch Your Shadow", which aims at increasing the participation of women in local politics.

References

External links
  
 Project "Watch Your Shadow" 

Women's empowerment
Women's organizations based in Turkey
Organizations based in Ankara
Organizations established in 1996
1996 establishments in Turkey